Laralyn McWilliams (born 25 February 1965 in Vicenza, Italy) is an American game designer and video game producer.

She was creative director for Free Realms, a massively multiplayer virtual world for teens and 'tweens. In 2010, she was recognized by Massive Online Gaming as one of the most influential people in MMOs, sharing the #1 slot with Sony Online president John Smedley. Citing her role as both designer and as spokesperson for Free Realms, she was "instrumental in building awareness, visibility, and interest.".

McWilliams was lead designer, producer or game director for games for Disney and DreamWorks. She was also lead designer for Full Spectrum Warrior at Pandemic Studios, and worked with John Singleton and Snoop Dogg on the canceled game Fear & Respect.

McWilliams was listed as one of the Top Women in MMOs in 2010, and was also one of the Gamasutra 20 for Women in Games. Laralyn wrote a post-mortem of Free Realms that was published in the April 2010 Game Developer Magazine.

In March 2011, McWilliams left SOE in San Diego.

She has a B.A. in Psychology from Vassar College, and a J.D. from St. Louis University School of Law.

In 2021, McWilliams' enduring legacy in the game industry was recognized by her peers with a Lifetime Achievement Award at the 21st Game Developers Choice Awards, which recognizes the career and achievements of a developer who has made an indelible impact on the craft of game development and games as a whole.

Game credits
Laralyn's game credits list is partially listed on the site MobyGames.

 Free Realms (2009),  Sony Online Entertainment Inc.
 Over the Hedge (2006), Activision Publishing, Inc.
 Full Spectrum Warrior (2004), THQ Inc.
 Sid Meier's Pirates! (2004), Atari, Inc.
 Disney's Stitch: Experiment 626 (2002),  Buena Vista Games, Inc.
 Sid Meier's Alpha Centauri (1999), Electronic Arts, Inc.
 The Elder Scrolls: Daggerfall (1996), Bethesda Softworks LLC

References

External links
 Personal website
 Eluminarts
 Laralyn McWilliams at MobyGames

1965 births
Living people
American video game designers
Video game developers
Vassar College alumni
Women video game developers